Dogs Trust, known until 2003 as the National Canine Defence League, is a British animal welfare charity and humane society which specialises in the well-being of dogs. It is the largest dog welfare charity in the United Kingdom, caring for over 15,000 animals each year. Dogs Trust's primary objective is to protect all dogs in the UK and elsewhere from maltreatment, cruelty and suffering. It focuses on the rehabilitation and rehoming of dogs which have been either abandoned or given up by their owners through rehoming services.

Dogs Trust has 22 rehoming centres across the UK and Ireland. Its first international rehoming centre opened in November 2009 in Dublin, Ireland.  Its charity guidelines ensure that no mentally or physically healthy dog taken into the protection of its rehoming centres are euthanised. Dogs Trust also manages microchipping and neutering schemes in the United Kingdom and abroad, in order to reduce the number of unwanted litters of puppies and stray dogs.

History
The National Canine Defence League (NCDL) was founded in 1891 at a meeting during the first Crufts show chaired by Lady Gertrude Stock.  The NCDL campaigned against vivisection, unnecessary muzzling and prolonged chaining, as well as providing care for stray dogs. It also campaigned against the cruel treatment of dogs by railway companies, who often refused to provide water for dogs. More unusually, in the 1920s, it provided AA wardens with pistols. This was because dogs and other animals were often involved in car accidents, and the pistols were provided to allow the wardens to euthanise the animal as a last resort in the worst cases. In November 1939, the NCDL spoke out against the mass euthanisation of approximately 750,000 pet dogs and cats upon the outbreak of World War II.

In 1957, the NCDL campaigned against the use of the Russian space dogs in space flight, organising a minute's silence in honour of Laika, who died in orbit from overheating and stress.  In 2003, the NCDL was rebranded as Dogs Trust. In 2016 the Trust declared an income of £98.4 million and expenditure of £86 million. In 2017 the Trust declared an income of £106.4 million, an increase of £8 million from 2016. In November 2017, Dogs Trust assisted in the effort to reduce dog homelessness in Bosnia and Herzegovina, by contributing to the funding of a major rehoming centre.  On 14 March 2019, Dogs Trust officially unveiled plans to open a new rehoming centre in Cardiff in 2021.

The charity is best known for its slogan "A Dog is for life, not just for Christmas", which is used either in full or shortened to "A Dog is for Life" in advertising. The phrase was created by Clarissa Baldwin, the former Chief Executive of the charity, to reduce the number of dogs which are abandoned as unwanted.  The slogan is a registered trademark. More recently it has adopted another slogan: "Dogs Trust Never Put a Healthy Dog Down". During the COVID-19 pandemic, they adapted this slogan to "A Dog is for Life, not just for Lockdown".

Rehoming 
Rehoming aims to re-home most dogs under its protection at the Dog Trust's 22 re-homing centres across the UK and Ireland. It also obtains two large mobile rehoming units known as 'Dogmobiles'. These are large vehicles fitted with air conditioned kennels and are specially designed to tour the local area, carrying a small number of dogs from nearby rehoming centres that are desperately seeking new homes.

Dogs Trust never euthanises healthy dogs, however some dogs suffering from potential trauma are unable to be rehabilitated in order to live in a normal home environment. The charity takes care of these dogs under its popular Sponsor a Dog scheme.

They have also created an animal sanctuary where selected dogs unable to be re-homed can live together free from excessive human contact.

List of Dogs Trust rehoming centres:

 Ballymena
 Basildon
 Bridgend
 Canterbury
 Darlington
 Manchester (Denton)
 Dublin, Ireland
 Evesham
 Glasgow
 Harefield (West London)
 Ilfracombe
 Kenilworth

 Leeds
 Loughborough
 Merseyside
 Newbury
 Shrewsbury (Roden)
 Salisbury (and sanctuary)
 Shoreham
 Snetterton
 West Calder
 Cardiff

At the beginning of June 2012, the charity opened its eighteenth UK re-homing centre in Leicestershire. Dogs Trust Loughborough aims to be the greenest animal rescue centre in the world. The center runs on renewable energy from its biomass boiler, green roofs, under-floor heating, solar thermal panels, photovoltaic panels and a rainwater recycling system. The project will be constructed with the aim to achieve BREEAM (BRE Environment Assessment Method) outstanding classification and the highest levels of sustainability. The charity says the facilities will significantly reduce running costs.

Campaigns

Dogs Trust has campaigned against docking of tails and unnecessary euthanasia, such as that carried out on foxhounds after fox hunting was banned by the Hunting Act 2004. It also offers free neutering services in certain poorer countries and runs international training programs  for other animal welfare charities to reduce feral populations.

Puppy Farming
In 2010 the charity introduced the term 'battery farming of dogs' to associate the practice of Puppy farming in the minds of the public with that of battery farming of chickens, and aims to educate the public as to where they can safely go to buy a 'cruelty-free dog'.

Compulsory Microchipping
In 2009 Dogs Trust started the process towards making microchipping compulsory for all dogs. They successfully lobbied for changes to the laws in the United Kingdom to make that happen starting in 2015. In 2017 they declared the program a success and lead the public to believe that their microchip program reduced the stray population of dogs in the UK and prevented euthanasia. However, they failed to mention that they had nearly doubled the amount of spay/neuter services for five years leading into the implementation of compulsory implant of microchips in all dogs in the UK, and have promoted a misconception that microchips (returns to owner) instead of spay/neuter reduces the population and prevents euthanasia. The following is a table of the UK dog population and the Dogs Trust spay/neuter and microchip services published by Dogs Trust.

Puppy smuggling
Since 2014, Dogs Trust has been working to reveal the cruel puppy smuggling trade. They have released yearly reports detailing this trade and encouraged MPs to back their campaign. This has included intercepting puppies far too young to be imported into the country and pregnant dogs being smuggled in so their puppies can be born and then sold in the UK. Dogs Trust set up the "Puppy Pilot", a scheme to intercept, care and rehabilitate puppies seized at ports before they are re-homed through the charity. In 2020 they continued this campaign, highlighting "Dogfishing". These are scams where apparently healthy pets are bought but suddenly fall ill or die soon after.

Celebrity support
 Patrons
Ruth Langsford (Patron; 2012—)
Eamonn Holmes (Patron; 2012—)
John Barrowman

 TV game show winnings
Jodie Prenger – £15,750 on The Chase: Celebrity Special (16 September 2012)
Eamonn Holmes – £3,100 on Tipping Point: Lucky Stars (4 August 2013)
Natasha Hamilton – £15,000 on Big Star's Little Star (23 April 2014)
Johnny Vegas and Maia Dunphy – £15,000 on All Star Mr & Mrs (18 June 2014)
Camilla Dallerup – £250 on Pointless Celebrities (29 November 2014)
Gary Delaney – £11,000 on Celebrity Fifteen to One (21 August 2015)

Outreach

Freedom Project
Dogs Trust Freedom Project provides foster care for dogs so those suffering domestic abuse can escape from these situations. The service operates in Greater London and the Home Counties (Hertfordshire, Essex, Kent, Surrey, East Sussex, West Sussex, Bedfordshire, Buckinghamshire and Berkshire), East Anglia (Norfolk, Suffolk and Cambridgeshire), Yorkshire, the North East and North West of England and Scotland. This essential service allows people to find safety in refuges which often don't accept pets.

Hope Project
Dogs Trust has been working with homelessness charities, such as St Mungos, throughout the United Kingdom for over 20 years to help support dogs owned by people in housing crisis. This includes giving out Christmas gift packages including items such as dog treats, leads and dog coats. The Project also helps those struggling with vets bills for their dogs.

Events

Waggy Walks
From 2009 to 2011, Dogs Trust held an annual charity event held at locations across the UK, where members of the public could complete either a 5 km or 10 km walk around a course in an area which is usually close to the rehoming centre for that location.

Dogs Trust Honours
In 2008, the charity created Dogs Trust Honours, an annual 'Doggy Pride of Britain Awards' ceremony celebrating the relationship between Human and dog and honouring dogs who have greatly helped their owner, local community or society.

Hampton Court Flower Show 2016
To mark the charity's 125th anniversary, a garden entitled "A Dog's Life" was designed by Paul Hervey-Brooks and built by G K Wilson Landscapes was shown at Hampton Court Flower Show 2016. It won a gold medal. The garden offered a semi-formal and contemporary area for both dogs and people. This included dog-friendly features and planting including tunnels and "sniffer tracks".

Rehoming figures

See also
 Swansea Jack  (1930–1937), twice decorated by the National Canine Defence League for bravery and devotion to duty
Cruelty to Animals
American Society for the Prevention of Cruelty to Animals
Battersea Dogs and Cats Home
The Blue Cross
National Animal Welfare Trust
PDSA
Royal New Zealand Society for the Prevention of Cruelty to Animals
Royal Society for the Prevention of Cruelty to Animals
DogsBlog.com
Cats Protection

References

External links

Dogs Trust homepage
More to Dogs Trust - details of Dogs Trust Outreach projects
Learn with Dogs Trust
How To Build Trust With Your Dog

Animal charities based in the United Kingdom
1891 establishments in the United Kingdom
Animal welfare organisations based in the United Kingdom
Dog welfare organizations
Animal rescue groups
Organizations established in 1891
Dogs in the United Kingdom